Cambria is an unincorporated community in Nicholas County, West Virginia, United States. Its post office  is closed.

References

Unincorporated communities in Nicholas County, West Virginia
Unincorporated communities in West Virginia
Coal towns in West Virginia